Jenny Jenny is a 1966 Greek comedy film directed by Dinos Dimopoulos.

Cast 
 Tzeni Karezi - Jenny Skoutari
 Dionysis Papagiannopoulos - Kosmas Skoutaris
 Andreas Barkoulis - Nikos Mantas
 Mary Lalopoulou - Diana Kassandri
 Eleni Zafeiriou - Matina Skoutari
 Dimitris Kallivokas - Andreas Dermezis
 Nana Skiada - Clara Karypi
 Lambros Konstantaras - Miltos Kassandris
 Athinodoros Prousalis - coachman

References

External links 

1966 comedy films
1966 films
Greek comedy films
1960s Greek-language films